Walter Calverley (c. 1570–1605) was an English squire from Yorkshire.

Perhaps the most infamous member of the Calverley family, he is most known for murdering two of his young children, leading to his own execution by pressing in 1605. His story became the basis for more than one literary work from the early 17th century.

Early life
Walter Calverley was born to Sir William Calverley and Lady Katherine Thorneholme, daughter of Sir John Thorneholme of Haysthorpe, Yorkshire and Lady Anne ( Salvin). 

The Calverleys were lords of the manors of Calverley and Pudsey, Yorkshire. As eldest son, Walter stood to inherit these manors from his father, Sir William. Sir William was the eldest son of Sir Walter Calverley (1535-15) and Lady Anne ( Danby) - Walter's paternal grandparents. Lady Anne was the daughter of Sir Christopher Danby of Farnerley, (1503-1571) and Lady Elizabeth ( Neville), the daughter of Sir Richard Neville, 2nd Baron Latimer (1468 – 1530) and Lady Anne ( Stafford). 

Sir William died when Calverley was a young child. Sir William Brooke, 10th Baron of Cobham, became Walter's legal guardian. As heir, Calverley inherited the family properties, including Calverley Hall, Burley-in-Wharfedale, Fagley, Farsley, Eccleshill, Bolton, and Seacroft.

Romance and marriage
In his teens, Walter fell in love with a local young woman from Calverley and proposed marriage. She accepted, and the young couple planned to marry. 

Shortly thereafter, Walter visited his guardian, Sir William Brooke, in London. Having already arranged a suitable marriage with a hefty dowry for his entitled ward, Brooke informed Walter that he would break his engagement and marry Phillipa Brooke (1585-1613), the daughter of Sir Henry Brooke, fifth son of Cobham, and Lady Anne (nee Sutton), daughter of Sir Henry Sutton of Nottinghamshire. 

Unfortunately, Walter and Phillipa disliked each other. However, dutifully, the couple wed in London. Walter forgot his previous engagement. Phillipa returned to Calverley Hall with Calverley.

Adult life 
Calverley engaged in a lifestyle revolving around alcohol and gambling. He incurred further debts and spent his inherited fortune.

He began studies at Clare Hall, Cambridge. However, he did not pursue a degree and matriculated that year.

Calverley and Phillipa had three sons together: William Calverley (1601-1605), Walter Calverley (1603-1605) and Henry Calverley (1604-1661).

1605 Murders 
On 23 April 1605, in an  intoxicated rage, Calverley brutally attacked Phillipa and his sons, William (4yrs) and Walter (18mos.) by stabbing. Tragically, Calverley killed both babes. However, Phillipa survived the attack as Calverley's knife did not pierce his wife's corset, inlaid with bone.

Calverley continued murderously through the house, throwing a nursemaid down stairs and ordering another servant to retrieve his youngest son, being in the care of a wet-nurse miles from home. When the servant failed to obey, Calverley saddled his horse and left the estate property. 
Summoned for help, authorities under Sir John Savile, 1st Baron Savile of Pontefract pursued Calverley. They successfully caught him and imprisoned him to answer for his crime(s). Calverley refused to plead guilty for the murders and was summarily convicted in August 1605 and sentenced to death. On 5 August 1605, Calverley was put to death by pressing at York Castle.

Aftermath 
The Calverley estates remained, escaping forfeiture, and descended to the youngest surviving Calverley, Sir Henry. Sir Henry grew up to be a royalist, incurring fines under the Commonwealth. On 1 January 1661, he died and his son, Walter, succeeded him. 

Sir Walter was later knighted by King Charles II in consideration of his father's loyalty to the crown. Sir Henry was the last of the family to reside regularly at Calverley Hall.

A widow, Lady Phillipa later remarried Sir Thomas Burton (1580-1655), 1st Baron of Stokerston, Leicestershire. Together, they had two daughters, Anne and Elizabeth. 

In 1613, Lady Phillipa died. Burton later remarried, producing a third child and his heir, Thomas (2nd Baron of Stokerston).

In literature

Calverley's position gave his crime wide notoriety. On 12 June Nathaniel Butter published a popular tract on the subject, which was followed on 24 August by an account of Calverley's death. A ballad was also issued by another publisher, Thomas Pavier, at the same time. Calverley's story was twice dramatised — first by George Wilkins in Miseries of Enforced Marriage (1607), and, secondly, in A Yorkshire Tragedy which was first published by Pavier in 1608, under the title A Yorkshire Tragedy - not so new as lamentable and true: written by W. Shakspeare. The latter was included in the third and fourth folios of William Shakespeare's works (1664 and 1685), but is no longer considered to be his work (modern scholarship generally favouring Thomas Middleton).

Aphra Behn reworked The Miseries of Enforced Marriage into her 1676 play, The Town Fop or, Sir Timothy Tawdry.

References

Sources
Attribution

 
 
 

1605 deaths
16th-century births
16th-century English people
17th-century English people
Alumni of Clare College, Cambridge
English murderers of children
Filicides in England
Murder in 1605
People executed for murder
Year of birth missing